Cotton was a township or village in the Sandbach parish of the county of Cheshire, on the banks of the River Dane.  It is now part of Congleton.

See also
 Cotton Edmunds

References

Villages in Cheshire